The Matupiri River is a river of Amazonas state in north-western Brazil.
It is a tributary of the Igapó-Açu River.

Course

The Matupiri River  forms in the  Rio Amapá Sustainable Development Reserve where the Jutaí and Novo rivers converge.
The Matupiri River runs through the centre of the Matupiri State Park from southwest to northeast, and provides the main way to access the interior of the park. 
It then runs through the northwest corner of the Matupiri Sustainable Development Reserve and then through the Cunhã-Sapucaia Indigenous Territory, within which it enters the Igapó-Açu River.

See also
List of rivers of Amazonas

References

Rivers of Amazonas (Brazilian state)